Vesoul is a commune in the Haute-Saône department in the region of Bourgogne-Franche-Comté located in eastern France.

It is the most populated municipality of the department with  inhabitants in 2014. The same year, the Communauté d'agglomération de Vesoul which covers 20 municipalities together had  inhabitants while the Urban area of Vesoul which includes 78 municipalities, had  inhabitants. Its inhabitants are known in French as Vésuliens.

Built on top of the hill of La Motte in the first millennium under the name of Castrum Vesulium, the city gradually evolved into a European commercial and economic center. At the end of the Middle Ages, the city experienced a challenging period beset with plagues, epidemics, and localized conflict.

Main urban center of the department, Vesoul is also home to a major PSA parts manufacturing plant and to the Vesoul International Film Festival of Asian Cinema.  It was immortalized by Jacques Brel in his 1968 song "Vesoul".

The town is the capital of the department of Haute-Saône.

History
Vesoul is first mentioned in a document dated 899. That document speaks about an elevation with a fortified watchtower. The document speaks about "Castrum Vesulium". Castrum is a fortification, and "Vesulium" has the syllable ves which meant hill or mountain in a language that was spoken before the Celts. Today, there is a castle that forms the centre of the city. The first houses were built inside the walls of the castle. Newcomers who found no place settled outside the city walls, on the flanks of the hill. Growing wine was popular.

The town was severely affected by the plague in 1586. It became part of France in 1678.

In 1814, after the fall of the empire, a buffer state was created, with Vesoul as capital. The principality was that of Free County, of the Vosges and of Porrentruy.

Today, one of the main factories of PSA Peugeot Citroën is near Vesoul.

Geography

Vesoul is located in the easter part of France, about 100 kilometers away from the Germany and the Switzerland's border and between the Jura and the Vosges's mountain ranges. Vesoul is also situated in the center of the Haute-Saône, which is in the nord of Bourgogne-Franche-Comté. Inside of this region, Vesoul is included in the Pays de Vesoul et du Val de Saône, a geographical region composing of the Vesoul's area and the northern part of the river Saône.

The town of Vesoul is located at the intersection of national roads N19 and N57. Vesoul station is on the SNCF Paris–Mulhouse railway line, and has connections with Paris, Belfort, Mulhouse and Chaumont.

The area of Vesoul is also included in the Pôle métropolitain Centre Franche-Comté which is a government structure unifying the biggest areas of central Franche-Comté. There are nine communes that are bordering the town of Vesoul.

Vesoul is crossed by four watercourses : two rivers (Durgeon and Colombine) and two streams (Vaugine and Méline). All of them are tributaries and sub-tributaries of the Saône, the fourth longest river in France with 473 kilometers long and flowing about ten kilometers from the western side of Vesoul.

Governance and politics

Mayors

Twin towns 
 Gerlingen, Germany, since 1964

Administrative division 
 Arrondissement of Vesoul
 Canton of Vesoul-1
 Canton of Vesoul-2

Population and society 
 Jean-Michel Nicolier ( 1 July 1966 – 20/21 November 1991), French volunteer in the Croatian War of Independence who was killed in the Vukovar massacre
 Sophie Bouillon (born 1984), independent journalist, winner of the 2009 Albert Londres Prize.

Demography

Media 
Vesoul is also the name of a song by Jacques Brel from 1968, a fast-paced waltz during the recording of which Brel famously yelled "Chauffe, Marcel, chauffe!" ("heat up, Marcel, heat up!") at his accordionist, Marcel Azzola.

The town is also mentioned facetiously in the satirical rap Fous ta cagoule by Michael Youn.

Sport 
 Vesoul Haute-Saône, football club
 Stade René Hologne
Cercle de Judo de Vesoul, Judo club with a competitors section

Education 
Vesoul has schools of higher education. The city has 1,200 students divided between an IUT, an IUFM, an Institute of Nursing Training, a School of Management and Commerce and BTS.  A Council of Student Life (CVE), led by the Officer in charge of Higher Education, was established in 2011. It offers activities to stimulate student life. In all, Vesoul has 10,000 students.

 All schools and studies in Vesoul

Culture and heritage

Monuments and tourist attractions

 Vieux Vesoul (Old Vesoul) (buildings from the 15th, 16th and 18th centuries and Garret Museum)
 Site of Vesoul's Motte
 Site of the Sabot de Frotey
 Lake of Vesoul - Vaivre
 Vesoul-Vaivre Vélo-rail
 Convent of the Ursulines (17th century)
 St. George's Church, Vesoul
 Gare de Vesoul
 PSA Vesoul Plant
 Synagogue of Vesoul
 Musée Georges-Garret
 Notre-Dame-de-la-Motte
 Paul Morel Hospital
 Lac de Vesoul - Vaivre

Festival 
 Vesoul International Film Festival of Asian Cinema

Library 
The first public library of Vesoul opened in 1771. The abbé (abbot) Bardenet, superior of the Saint-Esprit hospital in Besançon, gave his book collection to the town. There were 1772 books. The collections became a lot larger with the Revolution. At that time, the revolutionaries (people who led the French Revolution) took the books from the monasteries of the town (capucins) and even of the region (Luxeuil and Faverney monasteries). Around 20,000 books were added to the library this way, including some 11th century manuscripts. The Mayor's office was responsible for keeping the books.

In 1981, the municipality decided to build a new building to encourage the public to read. The library was recently equipped with computers. There are around 200 manuscripts and 150 incunables.

Areas

Notable people 

 Jean-Léon Gérôme
 Raymond Aubrac
 Édouard Belin
 Edwige Feuillère
 Charles Grandmougin
 Arthur Constantin Krebs
 Laurent Mangel
 Jean Pierre Marie Orchampt
 Robert Schurrer
 Stéphane Peterhansel
 Albert Cartier
 Abel Khaled
 Jean-Baptiste Humbert
 Alain Joyandet
 Yves Krattinger
 Mickaël Ravaux
 Jean-Xavier Bureau de Pusy
 Georges Cogniot
 Théodule-Armand Ribot
 Albert Mathiez
 Jean Peyrière 
 Julien Casoli
 Amédée Simon Dominique Thierry
 Affo Erassa
 Jean Compagnon
 Cédric Si Mohamed
 Katty Piejos
 Vincent Luis
 Frédéric Vichot
 Pascal Dagnan-Bouveret
 Jean-Michel Nicollier
 Pape Mamadou Diouf
 Roger Munier
 Jean-Joseph Gaume

Awards 
 Vesoul inaugurated the first Cyber Base France in 1999
 Voted "most athletic city of France" in 2001
 Labeled "Child Friendly City" by UNICEF in 2006. This label was renewed in 2009.
 Labeled "friendly and inclusive City" in 2010
 Labeled "Cities and villages in bloom" and has 3 flowers
 Labeled "QualiTri Collection" in 2012
 Vesoul is the second city in France to obtain ISO 14001 certification

See also
Communes of the Haute-Saône department
Sabot de Frotey National Nature Reserve

References

External links

 Official website 
 Proxoo.com – Site about the city center 

 
Communes of Haute-Saône
Prefectures in France
Sequani